San Nicolás de las Flores is part of Jalostotitlán, Jalisco, Mexico. The population was 291 at the 2000 census.

Economy
The main activities in the municipality are agriculture, cattle-farming, and the services industry.

References

Municipalities of Jalisco